HD 83443 b is an extrasolar planet approximately 134 light-years away in the constellation of Vela.  It was discovered in 2000 by the Geneva Extrasolar Planet Search Team led by Michel Mayor. It has a minimum mass comparable to Saturn, and its orbit is one of the shortest known, 1/25th that of Earth's. It takes only three days to complete one revolution around the star.

The planet HD 83443 b is named Buru. The name was selected in the NameExoWorlds campaign by Kenya, during the 100th anniversary of the IAU. Buru means dust in the Dholuo language.

References

Hot Jupiters
Vela (constellation)
Exoplanets discovered in 2002
Giant planets
Exoplanets detected by radial velocity
Exoplanets with proper names